A proprietary file format is a file format of a company, organization, or individual that contains data that is ordered and stored according to a particular encoding-scheme, designed by the company or organization to be secret, such that the decoding and interpretation of this stored data is easily accomplished only with particular software or hardware that the company itself has developed. The specification of the data encoding format is not released, or underlies non-disclosure agreements. A proprietary format can also be a file format whose encoding is in fact published, but is restricted through licences such that only the company itself or licensees may use it.  In contrast, an open format is a file format that is published and free to be used by everybody.

Proprietary formats are typically controlled by a company or organization for its own benefits, and the restriction of its use by others is ensured through patents or as trade secrets. It is thus intended to give the licence holder exclusive control of the technology to the (current or future) exclusion of others. 
Typically such restrictions attempt to prevent reverse engineering, though reverse engineering of file formats for the purposes of interoperability is generally believed to be legal by those who practice it. Legal positions differ according to each country's laws related to, among other things, software patents.

Because control over a format may be exerted in varying ways and in varying degrees, and documentation of a format may deviate in many different ways from the ideal, there is not necessarily a clear black/white distinction between open and proprietary formats.  Nor is there any universally recognized "bright line" separating the two. The lists of prominent formats below illustrate this point, distinguishing "open" (i.e. publicly documented) proprietary formats from "closed" (undocumented) proprietary formats and including a number of cases which are classed by some observers as open and by others as proprietary.

Privacy, ownership, risk and freedom
One of the contentious issues surrounding the use of proprietary formats is that of ownership of created content. If the information is stored in a way which the user's software provider tries to keep secret, the user may own the information by virtue of having created it, but they have no way to retrieve it except by using a version of the original software which produced the file. Without a standard file format or reverse engineered converters, users cannot share data with people using competing software. The fact that the user depends on a particular brand of software to retrieve the information stored in a proprietary format file increases barriers of entry for competing software and may contribute to vendor lock-in concept.

The issue of risk comes about because proprietary formats are less likely to be publicly documented and therefore less future proof. If the software firm owning right to that format stops making software which can read it then those who had used the format in the past may lose all information in those files. This is particularly common with formats that were not widely adopted. However, even ubiquitous formats such as Microsoft Word cannot be fully reverse-engineered.

Prominent proprietary formats

Open proprietary formats
 AAC – an open standard, but owned by Via Licensing
 GEDCOM – an open specification for genealogy data exchange, owned by the Church of Jesus Christ of Latter-day Saints
 MP3 – an open standard, but subject to patents in some countries

Closed proprietary formats
 CDR – (non-documented) CorelDraw's native format primarily used for vector graphic drawings
 DWG – (non-documented) AutoC
 AD drawing
 PSD – (documented) Adobe Photoshop's native image format
 RAR – (partially documented) archive and compression file format owned by Alexander L. Roshal
 WMA – a closed format, owned by Microsoft

Controversial
 RTF – a formatted text format (proprietary, published specification, defined and maintained only by Microsoft)
 SWF – Adobe Flash format (formerly closed/undocumented, now partially or completely open)
 XFA – Adobe XML Forms Architecture, used in PDF files (published specification by Adobe, required but not documented in the PDF ISO 32000-1 standard; controlled and maintained only by Adobe)
 ZIP – a base version of this data compression and archive file format is in the public domain, but newer versions have some patented features

Formerly proprietary
 GIF – CompuServe's Graphics Interchange Format (the specification's royalty-free licence requires implementers to give CompuServe credit as owner of the format; separately, patents covering certain aspects of the specification were held by Unisys until they expired in 2004)
 PDF – Adobe's Portable Document Format (open since 2008 - ISO 32000-1), but there are still some technologies indispensable for the application of ISO 32000-1 that are defined only by Adobe and remain proprietary (e.g. Adobe XML Forms Architecture, Adobe JavaScript).
 DOC – Microsoft Word Document (formerly closed/undocumented, now Microsoft Open Specification Promise)
 XLS – Microsoft Excel spreadsheet file format (formerly closed/undocumented, now Microsoft Open Specification Promise)
 PPT – Microsoft PowerPoint Presentation file format (formerly closed/undocumented, now Microsoft Open Specification Promise)

See also
 Open file format
 De facto standard
 Dominant design

References 

Computer file formats